The Securities Trust (SET) was a holding company established in 1924 jointly by the British Treasury and the Bank of England to dispose of certain government-owned assets. When the Disposal and Liquidation Commission was closed down that year, certain assets were transferred to SET:

References

1924 establishments in England